Adriano Leonardo Alves  (born January 5, 1977) is a retired Brazilian footballer. He was the first Brazilian to play in Iranian Football, where he played in the Premier Football League for eight seasons.

Club career 
Alves started his career at Brazilian side Central Sport Club where he managed local success in the Campeonato Pernambucano, he attracted interest from Azadegan League clubs who seek players from Brazil who are cheap relative to European players and skillful, Shahab Zanjan a newly formed club at the time signed Alves on November 21, 2002. Alves scored 2 goals in his debut for the club, and was soon spotted by IPL side Esteghlal Ahvaz whom he played for, for four years.  In 2006, he was transferred to the newly promoted Iranian Premier League side Mes Kerman F.C. in which he has played a crucial role in the 2006–07 Persian Gulf Cup season. He was transferred  to Saipa for 2007–08 season and later signed with Pegah in the summer 2008 transfer window. In the beginning of 2008–09 season Pegah was sold to Damash Iranian and named Damash Gilan. Despite having a good season in Damash by scoring 12 goals, Damash was relegated to the Azadegan League and Alvez joined to Malavan in summer 2009.

Club career statistics
Last Update: 30 August 2011 

 Assist Goals

Notes

1977 births
Living people
Brazilian footballers
Association football forwards
Persian Gulf Pro League players
Esteghlal Ahvaz players
Sanat Mes Kerman F.C. players
Pegah Gilan players
Damash Gilan players
Malavan players
Saipa F.C. players
Brazilian expatriate footballers
Expatriate footballers in Iran